The men's 110 metres hurdles event at the 2002 Asian Athletics Championships was held in Colombo, Sri Lanka on 10–11 August.

Medalists

Results

Heats
Wind:Heat 1: +2.4 m/s, Heat 2: +1.9 m/s, Heat 3: +2.6 m/s

Final
Wind: +2.9 m/s

References

2002 Asian Athletics Championships
Sprint hurdles at the Asian Athletics Championships